ZTE is a Chinese telecommunication equipment company.

ZTE may also refer to:
Zalaegerszegi TE, a once-time champion Hungarian football team
ISO 639:zte, a code referring to the Zapotec languages
Zero thermal expansion, a property of materials that do not expand when being heated